PartyNextDoor (stylized in all caps) is the eponymous debut extended play by Canadian recording artist PartyNextDoor. It was released on July 1, 2013, by OVO Sound and Warner Records.

Promotion
PartyNextDoor was initially promoted through a series of posts on Canadian rapper Drake's October’s Very Own blog, the official OVO Sound blog. These posts included SoundCloud posts of material later used on PartyNextDoor including "Make A Mil" and "Wus Good/Curious". These songs were further promoted on Twitter by both Drake and the official October’s Very Own account. The album’s release date was announced, again via the October’s Very Own blog, on June 20, 2013.

PartyNextDoor appeared on the North American leg of Drake’s Would You Like a Tour?, marking his first tour. Vinyl and CD copies of PARTYNEXTDOOR were available for sale exclusively at the October’s Very Own merchandise booth at all Would You Like A Tour? shows. The official video for "Break From Toronto" was released on 23 October 2013 and PARTYNEXTDOOR's official Vimeo page.

Reception 

Though receiving few critical reviews, and with relatively little promotion, PartyNextDoors release sold 2,000 copies in its first week, placing it at number six on the Billboard Heatseekers Albums chart and number 34 on the Top R&B/Hip-Hop Albums chart.

Track listing
All tracks are produced by PartyNextDoor, except where noted.

Sample credits
 "Welcome to the Party" contains  elements of “Before We Talked”, written and performed by Gold Panda.
 "Wild Bitches" contains elements of “Loud Mouths”, written and performed by Wise Blood.
  "Right Now" contains elements from “Hyperlips”, written and performed by Com Truise.
 “Break From Toronto” contains elements of “Girl With The Tattoo (All I Want Is You)”, written and performed by Miguel.
  “Wus Good / Curious” contains elements of “Chatoyant”, written by Sabzi and Kelsey Bulkin, and performed by Made In Heights.

Personnel 
Credits for PartyNextDoor from PartyNextDoor official Facebook page.

 Marc-Olivier Bouchard – mastering
 Noel Cadastre – engineer
 Noel "Gadget" Campbell – mixing
 PartyNextDoor – engineer, primary artist, producer
 Paolo Azarraga – photography

Charts

Certifications

References

2013 debut EPs
PartyNextDoor albums
Albums produced by PartyNextDoor
OVO Sound EPs
Warner Records EPs